This article describes extreme locations of the Solar System. Entries listed in bold are Solar System-wide extremes.

By feature

By class

By object

By distance
 List of Solar System objects most distant from the Sun

See also

 Solar System
 Lists of geological features of the Solar System
 List of gravitationally rounded objects of the Solar System

Notes

References

External links
 Yale-New Haven Teachers Institute, 07.03.03: "Voyage to the Planets" by Nicholas R. Perrone, 2007 (accessed November 2010)
 Journey Through the Galaxy: "Planets of the Solar System" by Stuart Robbins and David McDonald, 2006 (accessed November 2010)
 The Nine Planets, "Appendix 2: Solar System Extrema" by Bill Arnett, 2007 (accessed November 2010)
 EnchantedLearning.com, "Solar System Extremes", 2010 (accessed November 2010)

See also
 Extremes on Earth

List of extremes
Solar System extremes
Solar System extremes
Extremes
Solar system